Jimmy Cournoyer (born October 1979), sometimes called the Pot Playboy or the King of Pot, is a convicted Canadian drug trafficker and prior to being arrested, the biggest supplier of marijuana to New York and the U.S. East Coast. He was known for his lavish lifestyle, which included dating lingerie models and partying with Hollywood actor Leonardo DiCaprio.

Originally from Laval, Quebec, Cournoyer was first arrested in 1998 with a few marijuana plants in his Laval apartment. Over several spells in prison, Cournoyer built up a criminal network that grew into a multibillion-dollar international drug trafficking empire that involved the Hells Angels, the Sinaloa Cartel, Native American smugglers, and the Rizzuto and Bonanno crime families. The DEA got a lead on his organization after information provided by a disgruntled girlfriend led to the arrest of Cournoyer and Bonanno associate John Venizelos in 2012.

In 2012, Cournoyer was arrested as he tried to enter Mexico. In May 2013, Cournoyer pleaded guilty to two charges: money laundering and conspiracies to manufacture and distribute cocaine and marijuana. He was sentenced to 27 years' imprisonment. His friend and former UFC champion Georges St-Pierre wrote a letter asking the judge for clemency. St-Pierre later apologized to his fans, calling his signing of the letter a 'mistake'. Prosecutors also claimed Cournoyer had $2 million put aside for murdering potential witnesses.

References

1979 births
Living people
People from Laval, Quebec
French Quebecers
Canadian people imprisoned abroad
Canadian cannabis traffickers
Canadian people convicted of drug offences
People convicted of money laundering